Shinsuke (written: , , , , , , , , , , ,  or ) is a masculine Japanese given name. Notable people with the name include:

, Japanese actor
, Japanese samurai
, Japanese basketball player
, Japanese swimmer
, Japanese actor
, Japanese professional wrestler and mixed martial artist
, Japanese writer
, Japanese film director
, Japanese baseball player
, Japanese politician
, Japanese footballer
, Japanese film director, screenwriter and video game designer
, Japanese comedian and television presenter
, Japanese footballer
, Japanese politician
, Japanese skeleton racer
, Japanese boxer

Fictional characters 

 Shinsuke Kita (北 信介), a character from the manga and anime Haikyu!! with the position of wing spiker and the captain of Inarizaki High

 Shinsuke Takasugi (高杉 晋助) a character from the manga and anime Gintama 

Japanese masculine given names